Joseph Lawrence may refer to:

 Joseph Lawrence (Pennsylvania politician) (1786–1842), US Congressman
 Joseph Lawrence (British politician) (1848–1919), British MP
 Joseph Lawrence, inventor of Listerine
 Joe Lawrence (born 1977), baseball player

See also 
 Joey Lawrence (disambiguation)